The 2013 NASCAR K&N Pro Series East was the 27th season of the K&N Pro Series East. It began with the DRIVE4COPD 125 at Bristol Motor Speedway on March 17, and ended with the Road Atlanta 115 at Road Atlanta on October 18. Kyle Larson entered the season as the defending Drivers' Champion.

Dylan Kwasniewski won the championship after collecting five race wins during the season, along with 8 top fives and 10 top tens. Kwasniewski finished 33 points ahead of his closest rival in the points standings, Brett Moffitt. Moffitt finished with 5 top fives and 10 top tens, but failed to win a race. Third place in the championship went to Daniel Suárez, who took one victory on the season. Cole Custer and Ben Kennedy collected two victories, while Brandon Gdovic, Ryan Gifford, Michael Self, and Austin Hill each collected a victory.

Schedule
The UNOH Battle at the Beach was an exhibition race and did not count towards the championship.

Notes

Results and standings

Races

See also

 2013 NASCAR Sprint Cup Series
 2013 NASCAR Nationwide Series
 2013 NASCAR Camping World Truck Series
 2013 ARCA Racing Series
 2013 NASCAR K&N Pro Series West
 2013 NASCAR Canadian Tire Series
 2013 NASCAR Toyota Series
 2013 NASCAR Whelen Euro Series

References

ARCA Menards Series East